Albert Robles is an American politician, is California's senior Latino elected official since November 1991 and the former Mayor of Carson, California. When first elected in 1991 he was California's youngest person to hold public office.  A member of the Democratic Party, Robles was elected mayor in 2015 to fill a vacancy and re-elected in 2016. Previously, he was a member of the Carson City Council. Robles is also a seven-term board member for the Water Replenishment District of Southern California, although his dual elected offices are the subject of a legal challenge.

Education
Robles earned a dual Bachelors from the University of Colorado at Boulder, a Juris Doctor degree from the UC Berkeley School of Law and a master's degree from the University of Southern California, where he was a USC Merit Scholarship recipient.

Career
Robles was first elected to public office in 1992 when he was 23 years old to the Water Replenishment District of Southern California Board of Directors, representing Division 5. In 1992 he was the youngest elected official in California. He is the youngest Director elected to the WRD  board and has been re-elected to seven terms, most recently in 2016. In 2013, he was elected to the Carson City Council. He became mayor in 2015 to fill a vacancy created by the resignation of Mayor Jim Dear. In 2016, Carson voters re-elected Robles, who received 55.2 percent of the vote over former Mayor Dear.

Robles was a strong supporter for an NFL stadium to be built in Carson. During one press conference Robles wore a mashup jersey featuring the logos for both the Chargers and the Raiders.

Robles represented former South Gate treasurer Albert T. Robles (no relation) during the appeal of the latter's earlier 2004 corruption conviction.

2006 Vernon city elections
Robles was involved in the controversial 2006 elections in Vernon, California, the first elections held in that city since 1980. Robles represented the challengers in the city council election who 
moved into an abandoned building in the city so they could register to vote. The Vernon city clerk accused Albert T. Robles of being involved in the scheme. A court upheld the candidates' right to run in the election. Afterwards, Leonis C. Malburg, the mayor of Vernon, was indicted and eventually convicted of conspiracy, perjury, and voter fraud.

Campaign for Los Angeles County District Attorney
In 2008, Robles ran against Steve Cooley in the election for Los Angeles County District Attorney, receiving 20% of the vote coming in second among three candidates. During the campaign, Robles faced misdemeanor charges filed against him by Cooley's office in November 2007. Robles was charged with printing a pair of political mailers without a return address and expending more than $100 cash in a political campaign. Robles accused Cooley of direct involvement in the charges brought against him because of a personal vendetta and to effect outcome of the election. Cooley denied those allegations. Although Robles lost to Cooley in June 2008, a jury found Robles not guilty of all charges after deliberating for only twenty (20) minutes and he was re-elected in November 2008 to his seat on the Water Replenishment board.

Controversies
In 2016, Los Angeles County prosecutors sued Robles to prevent him from keeping his seat on the Water Replenishment Board, claiming that a person cannot serve as mayor (or city council member) and water board member at the same time.

Robles is the subject of a separate probe by county prosecutors over his city of residence. The Los Angeles Times reported that Robles is actually living in the Adams-Normandie neighborhood of Los Angeles, but he is claiming he resides at his parents’ home in Carson.

Robles faced multiple campaign finance violations for failing to submit documents during the 2012 and 2016 elections. He initially had been ordered to pay at least $85,000 in fines, and agreed to pay $12,000 to settle the violations.

Robles was also facing a state ethics inquiry after "failing to submit state-required disclosure statements for his political campaign finances and personal economic interests for both his elected jobs." This also became part of the $12,000 settlement.

Robles was also the subject of a sexual harassment suit brought by another Water Replenishment District director after losing a re-election campaign for the position in 2014. The former appointed director was the daughter of former CA Lieutenant Governor, Congressman, and Assemblyman  Mervyn Dymally, but Robles denied the allegation. The judge in the case dismissed the unverified action with prejudice.

Robles was scrutinized due to his alleged intent for potential pension spiking.

References

External links
Official Carson, CA Mayor Attorney Albert Robles Biography 
Official Water Replenishment District of Southern California Division 5 Bio

Mayors of places in California
Living people
California Democrats
1969 births